Taga is a village in the Bhiwani district of the Indian state of Haryana. , the village had nine households with a population of 45 of which 23 were male and 22 female.

References

Villages in Bhiwani district